Middle man or Middleman or The Middle Men may refer to:

 an intermediary, such as:
 a wholesaler
 a reseller

Film, television and books
 Middle Man (film), a 2016 American black comedy
 Middle Man (1990 film), the fifth installment in the Chinese In the Line of Duty film series
 The Middle Man (film), a 2021 multi-national comedy
 The Middleman (film), alternate title for Jana Aranya, a 1976 Bengali film
 The Middleman is a comic published by notable independent publisher Viper Comics
 The Middleman (TV series), an ABC Family TV series based on the comic
 Middle Men (film), a 2009 film
 "The Middle Men", an episode of Torchwood

Music
 Middle Man (album), a 1980 album by Boz Scaggs, or its title track
 Middleman (band), a 4-piece alternative band based in Leeds in West Yorkshire, England
 "Middleman", a song by Bright Eyes from the album Cassadaga
 "Middleman" (song), a 1994 song by Terrorvision
 "Middle Man", a song by Jack Johnson from the album Brushfire Fairytales
 "Middle Man", a song by LeAnn Rimes from the album All That
 "Middle Man", a song by Little River Band from the album First Under the Wire
 "Middle Man", a song by Living Colour from the album Vivid
 "Middle Man / Mr. Mister", a song by B.o.B. from the album Ether
 "Middle Men", a song by Sleaford Mods from the album Divide and Exit

See also
 Man in the middle (disambiguation)